The pertechnetate ion is an oxyanion with the chemical formula . It is often used as a convenient water-soluble source of isotopes of the radioactive element technetium (Tc). In particular it is used to carry the 99mTc isotope (half-life 6 hours) which is commonly used in nuclear medicine in several nuclear scanning procedures. 

A technetate(VII) salt is a compound containing this ion. Pertechnetate compounds are salts of technetic(VII) acid. Pertechnetate is analogous to permanganate but it has little oxidizing power. Pertechnetate has higher oxidation power than perrhenate.

Understanding pertechnetate is important in understanding technetium contamination in the environment and in nuclear waste management.

Chemistry
 is the starting material for most of the chemistry of technetium. Pertechnetate salts are usually colorless.  is produced by oxidizing technetium with nitric acid or with hydrogen peroxide. The pertechnetate anion is similar to the permanganate anion but is a weaker oxidizing agent. It is tetrahedral and diamagnetic. The standard electrode potential for / is only +0.738 V in acidic solution, as compared to +1.695 V for /. Depending on the reducing agent,  can be converted to derivatives containing Tc(VI), Tc(V), and Tc(IV). In the absence of strong complexing ligands,  is reduced to a +4 oxidation state via the formation of  hydrate.

Pharmaceutical use
Radiopharmaceuticals have no intended pharmacologic effect and are used in very low concentrations. Radiopharmaceuticals containing  are currently being applied in the determining morphology of organs, testing of organ function, and scintigraphic and emission tomographic imaging. The gamma radiation emitted by the radionuclide allows organs to be imaged in vivo tomographically.

Specific imaging applications
 is used primarily in the study of the thyroid gland - its morphology, vascularity, and function.  and iodide, due to their comparable charge/radius ratio, are similarly incorporated into the thyroid gland. The pertechnetate ion is not incorporated into the thyroglobulin. It is also used in the study of blood perfusion, regional accumulation, and cerebral lesions in the brain, as it accumulates primarily in the choroid plexus.

Pertechnetate salts, such as sodium pertechnetate, cannot pass through the blood–brain barrier. In addition to the salivary and thyroid glands,  localizes in the stomach.  is renally eliminated for the first three days after being injected. After a scanning is performed, it is recommended that a patient drink large amounts of water in order to expedite elimination of the radionuclide. Other methods of  administration include intraperitoneal, intramuscular, subcutaneous, as well as orally. The behavior of the  ion is essentially the same, with small differences due to the difference in rate of absorption, regardless of the method of administration.

Preparation of 99mTcO4−

The eluate from the column must be sterile and pyrogen free, so that the Tc drug can be used directly, usually within 12 hours of elution. In a few cases, sublimation or solvent extraction may be used.

Synthesis of 99mTcO4− radiopharmaceuticals
 is advantageous for the synthesis of a variety of radiopharmaceuticals because Tc can adopt a number of oxidation states. The oxidation state and coligands dictate the specificity of the radiopharmaceutical. The starting material , made available after elution from the generator column, as mentioned above, can be reduced in the presence of complexing ligands. Oxalates, formates, hydroxylamine, and hydrazine are also avoided because they form complexes with the technetium. Electrochemical reduction is impractical.

Kits are available that contain the reducing agent, usually tin(II) and ligands. These kits are sterile, pyrogen-free, easily purchased, and can be stored for long periods of time. The reaction with  takes place directly after elution from the generator column and shortly before its intended use. A high organ specificity is important because the injected activity should accumulate in the organ under investigation, as there should be a high activity ratio of the target organ to nontarget organs. If there is a high activity in organs adjacent to the one under investigation, the image of the target organ can be obscured. Also, high organ specificity allows for the reduction of the injected activity, and thus the exposure to radiation, in the patient. The radiopharmaceutical must be kinetically inert, in that it must not change chemically in vivo en route to the target organ.

Examples
This compound is a precursor to complexes that can be used in cancer diagnosis and therapy involving DNA-DNA pretargeting.

Compounds

Reactions 

 

 Pertechnetate can be reduced by H2S to give Tc2S7.
 Pertechnetate is also reduced to Tc(IV/V) compounds in alkaline solutions in nuclear waste tanks without adding catalytic metals, reducing agents, or external radiation.  Reactions of mono- and disaccharides with 99m yield Tc(IV) compounds that are water-soluble.

Uses

As a 99mTc carrier 
A technetium-99m generator provides the pertechnetate containing the short-lived isotope 99mTc for medical uses. This compound is generated directly from molybdate held on alumina within the generator (see this topic for detail).

In nuclear medicine 
Pertechnetate has a wide variety of uses in diagnostic nuclear medicine. Since technetate(VII) can substitute for iodine in the Na/I symporter (NIS) channel in follicular cells of the thyroid gland, inhibiting uptake of iodine into the follicular cells, 99mTc-pertechnetate can be used as an alternative to 123I in imaging of the thyroid, although it specifically measures uptake and not organification. It has also been used historically to evaluate for testicular torsion, although ultrasound is more commonly used in current practice, as it does not deliver a radiation dose to the testes. It is also used in labeling of autologus red blood cells for MUGA scans to evaluate left ventricular cardiac function, localization of gastrointestinal bleeding prior to embolization or surgical management, and in damaged red blood cells to detect ectopic splenic tissue. 

It is actively accumulated and secreted by the mucoid cells of the gastric mucosa, and therefore, technetate(VII) radiolabeled with technetium-99m is injected into the body when looking for ectopic gastric tissue as is found in a Meckel's diverticulum with Meckel's scans.

Non-radioactive uses

All technetium salts are mildly radioactive, but some of them have explored use of the element for its chemical properties. In these uses, its radioactivity is incidental, and generally the least radioactive (longest-lived) isotopes of Tc are used. In particular, 99Tc (half-life 211,000 years) is used in corrosion research, because it is the decay product of the easily obtained commercial 99mTc isotope. Solutions of technetate(VII) react with the surface of iron to form technetium dioxide, in this way it is able to act as an anodic corrosion inhibitor.

See also
Permanganate
Perrhenate
Sodium pertechnetate

References 

 
Transition metal oxyanions
Radiopharmaceuticals
Medical physics
Corrosion inhibitors